Im Banne des Unheimlichen (lit. Under the Spell of the Unknown); English title The Zombie Walks, a.k.a.

Plot
Scotland Yard's Inspector Higgins (Joachim Fuchsberger) becomes involved in a case that began with the corpse of Sir Oliver supposedly laughing from inside of his own coffin during his funeral. Soon people who were close to Sir Oliver start to get killed. Sir Oliver's brother Sir Cecil swears he saw his dead brother jaunting around the countryside in a skeleton costume. Higgins teams up with reporter Peggy Brand (Siw Mattson) and his bumbling chief Sir Arthur (Hubert von Meyerinck) to unmask the villain who is killing people with a poisoned scorpion ring.

Cast

Production
The screenplay for the film is based on the novel The Hand of Power by Edgar Wallace.

Reception
The film premiered at the "Europa" cinema at Oberhausen in West Germany on April 17, 1968.

References

External links

1968 films
1960s mystery films
1960s crime thriller films
German mystery films
German crime thriller films
West German films
1960s German-language films
Films directed by Alfred Vohrer
Films based on British novels
Films set in England
Films based on works by Edgar Wallace
1960s German films